Suo jure is a Latin phrase, used in English to mean 'in his own right' or 'in her own right'. In most nobility-related contexts, it means 'in her own right', since in those situations the phrase is normally used of women; in practice, especially in England, a man rarely derives any style or title from his wife (an example is  Richard Neville, earl of Warwick from his wife's heritage) although this is seen in other countries when a woman is the last heir of her line. It can be used for a male when such male was initially a 'co-lord' with his father or other family member and upon the death of such family member became the sole ruler or holder of the title "in his own right" (Alone).

It is commonly encountered in the context of titles of nobility or honorary titles, e.g. Lady Mayoress, and especially in cases where a woman holds a title through her own bloodline or accomplishments rather than through her marriage.

An empress or queen who reigns suo jure is referred to as an "empress regnant" or "queen regnant", those terms often being contrasted with empress consort or queen consort: "empress" and "queen" are, however, often used alone to refer to either a regnant or consort, the distinction being indicated by context.

Examples of suo jure titles
 
Ela of Salisbury, 3rd Countess of Salisbury – countess suo jure
Anne of Austria, Landgravine of Thuringia- duchess of luxembourg  suo jure
Marjorie, Countess of Carrick- countess suo jure
 Matilda, Margrave of Tuscany – Italian, Imperial Vicar and Vice-Queen of Italy suo jure, Margrave suo jure
 Eleanor, Duchess of Aquitaine – French, then English queen consort, duchess suo jure
 Mary, Duchess of Burgundy – Queen consort of the Romans, duchess suo jure
 Anne Marie Louise d'Orléans, Duchess of Montpensier – French princess, peeress suo jure
 Hawise, Duchess of Brittany – duchess suo jure
 Henrietta Godolphin, 2nd Duchess of Marlborough – English peeress suo jure
 Maria Theresa of Austria – Austrian archduchess regnant, Hungarian and Bohemian queen regnant
 Elizabeth of Russia – Russian empress regnant
 Princess Wilhelmine, Duchess of Sagan – Princess of Courland, duchess suo jure
 Princess Alexandra, 2nd Duchess of Fife – British princess, duchess suo jure
 Cayetana Fitz-James Stuart, 18th Duchess of Alba – Spanish grandee suo jure
 Patricia Mountbatten, 2nd Countess Mountbatten of Burma – British countess suo jure
 Jane Heathcote-Drummond-Willoughby, 28th Baroness Willoughby de Eresby – British baroness suo jure
 Rosalinda Álvares Pereira de Melo, 1st Duchess of Cadaval-Hermès – Portuguese duchess suo jure
 Diana Álvares Pereira de Melo, 11th Duchess of Cadaval – half-sister of the above, Portuguese duchess ad personam and suo jure 
Jeanne d'Albret – queen regnant of Navarre
 Margaret of Mar, 31st Countess of Mar – Scottish peeress suo jure
 Anne Hamilton, 3rd Duchess of Hamilton – Scottish duchess suo jure
 Catherine Willoughby, 12th Baroness Willoughby de Eresby – English baroness suo jure
 Joan of Kent – suo jure 4th Countess of Kent and 5th Baroness Wake of Liddell
 Queen Anne Boleyn of England – Marquess of Pembroke suo jure
 Elizabeth II, suo jure Queen of the United Kingdom of Great Britain and Northern Ireland and several other Commonwealth realms
 Catharina-Amalia, Princess of Orange became, in 2013, the first suo jure Hereditary Princess of Orange since Mary of Baux in 1417
 Princess Elisabeth, Duchess of Brabant became, in 2013, the first-ever suo jure Hereditary Duchess of Brabant
 Princess Leonor of Spain – Princess of Asturias suo jure
 Claude, Queen Consort of France – French princess, Hereditary Duchess of Brittany suo jure
 Ada, Countess of Atholl – countess suo jure
 Augusto Pinochet – senator-for-life suo jure, from 1998 to abolishment in 2002

See also
 List of peerages created for women in the peerages of the British Isles
 List of peerages inherited by women in the peerages of the British Isles
 Jure uxoris
 List of Latin phrases

References

Nobility
Latin words and phrases